Man's Woman is a 1917 American silent drama film directed by Travers Vale and starring Ethel Clayton, Rockliffe Fellowes and Edward Kimball.

Cast
 Ethel Clayton as Violet Galloway 
 Rockliffe Fellowes as Roger Kendall 
 Frank Goldsmith as George W. Graham 
 Justine Cutting as Lucretia Kendall 
 Eugenie Woodward as Harriet Kendall 
 Johnny Hines as Dopey Louis 
 Ned Burton as Steve Barnett 
 Edward Kimball as Jimmy Regan 
 Magda Foy as Young girl

References

Bibliography
 George A. Katchmer. Eighty Silent Film Stars: Biographies and Filmographies of the Obscure to the Well Known. McFarland, 1991.

External links
 

1917 films
1917 drama films
1910s English-language films
American silent feature films
Silent American drama films
Films directed by Travers Vale
American black-and-white films
World Film Company films
Films shot in Fort Lee, New Jersey
1910s American films